Mani Martin is a Rwandan singer, songwriter, actor and performing artist. He has won numerous awards. His unique musical sound that reflects the Afro-fusion, urban and traditional sounds has received National & international attention hence being described by "Rwanda Spectrum Magazine" as one of the best live music performing artists of the Rwandan music scene. Mani  sings in Kinyarwanda, Kiswahili, English and French.

History

Early years
Mani was born on 24 December 1988 in Ntura village in the Western  Province of Rwanda. He grew up in a Charity Home.

Musical career
His talent was discovered at the age of nine, he composed his first song called "Barihe" which means "where are they" as a way to release the endless questions in the mind of Rwanda innocent child three years after the tragic history of the 1994 Genocide against the Tutsi. In 2000, Mani recorded a tape of  12  songs titled "Agapfa kaburiwe ni Impango" which opened a door  for him to tour Rwanda performing in various churches; as well, he released the Swahili version called "Urukumbuzi and Kumbukumbu".
In 2010, after high school, Mani he founded his own band (Kesho Band) and started performing at different and started performing in small events, weddings and hotel events in order to earn a living outside charity home and to cater for his further education.

Discography

Studio albums

Movie
Beyond his musical career, Mani has also explored acting and starred in the film "Long Coat" in 2009 which explored the lives of Rwandans after the Genocide of 1994 and kept collaborating with movie industry by providing music for films and creating sound tracks for different movies.

Awards & nominations

Concerts
Mani has performed both locally and on international festivals such as.
 Sauti Za Busara in Zanzibar
 Amani festival" in DRC
 Bayimba International Festival" 2013 in Uganda
 Jeux de la francophonie in France
 Fespaco festival in Burkina Faso
 Transform Africa in Rwanda
 AU Summit
 World Economic Forum in Kigali
 Kigali Up festival
 Iwacu Music Festival

Personal life
In February 2013, Mani was badly injured in a motorcycle accident. After hospitalization, the artist went on to make a full recovery and went to perform in Souti zabusara festival. Mani started recording songs on different topics other than  just gospel songs hence was criticized by the people who wanted him to sing only gospel songs. In 2014, he lost his voice after swallowing a piece of toothpick, that wounded his vocal chords at the level of not being able to sing or speak, after a three months medical follow up he got his voice back and started to work on his Afro album  On 7 July 2017, he graduated with a Bachelor in Media and Mass Communication from Mount Kenya University.

Music style
His songs are characterised by message about peace, love and humanity thus being invited to take part in various peace events such as "Mani Martin Japan Peace Tour" organised by UNICEF Japan with NPO T.E.R, UNAMID Peace celebration in Darfur organised by Unamid Darfur Sudan. Mani envisions the world where people live in love, peace and harmony where all lives are treated with respect and dignity. Mani has various collaborations with Eddy Kenzo and Sauti Sol.

References

External links
Popular music in Rwanda
Sauti za Busara: East Africa's Top Music Festival

Rwandan music
1988 births
Living people